Barbara Armbrust (born August 13, 1963, in St. Catharines, Ontario) is a Canadian rower. She won a silver medal in the Coxed Fours event at the 1984 Summer Olympics.

A graduate of the University of Victoria, Barbara Armbrust began representing Canada in 1980, when she came in fourth as a member of a coxed eights crew at the Junior World Championships. The following year, at the same tournament, she was fifth in the coxed fours and seventh in the coxed eights. She then moved up to the senior level and, in 1983, placed fourth in the coxed fours at that year’s World Championships, alongside Gail Cort, Kathey Lichty, Jane Tregunno, and Lesley Thompson-Willie. She won silver in that event at the 1984 Summer Olympics, with Tregunno, Thompson-Willie, Marilyn Brain, and Angela Schneider, and bronze at the 1985 World Championships, alongside Thompson-Willie, Christine Clarke, Lisa Robertson, and Tricia Smith. After failing to reach the final of the quadruple sculls at the 1986 World Championships, with Brain, Silken Laumann, and Kay Worthington, Armbrust retired from active competition.

References

External links 
 

1963 births
Living people
Canadian female rowers
Olympic rowers of Canada
Olympic silver medalists for Canada
Rowers at the 1984 Summer Olympics
Rowers from St. Catharines
Olympic medalists in rowing
World Rowing Championships medalists for Canada
Medalists at the 1984 Summer Olympics
20th-century Canadian women